Arnborg Lervig (born 20 October 1997) is a Faroese football midfielder who currently plays for ÍF/Víkingur/B68 and the Faroe Islands women's national football team.

References 

1997 births
Living people
Faroese women's footballers
Faroe Islands women's youth international footballers
Faroe Islands women's international footballers
Women's association football defenders